Speziale is an Italian village and hamlet (frazione) of the municipality of Fasano in the Province of Brindisi, Apulia. As of 2011 its population was 423.

History
The village takes its name from an apothecary (it: speziale) who once lived there.

Geography
Located in upper Salento, Speziale lies a few kilometres from the sea and the hills of the Itria Valley. The surrounding area is notable for large plantations of secular (i.e. long-lived) olive trees.

Architecture
The village has farmhouses and typical Apulian white-painted buildings. Its church, dedicated to Santa Maria del Rosario, was built in the early twentieth century.

Events
Every year, on the first Sunday of August, the town holds a festival, the Sagra della focaccia.

See also
Egnatia
Torre Canne

References

External links 
Speziale on Facebook

Frazioni of the Province of Brindisi
Fasano